Now That's What I Call Music! 41 was released on February 7, 2012. It is the 41st edition of the Now! series in the United States. The album debuted at number three on the Billboard 200 for the week ending February 24, 2012, after selling 142,000 units in its first week of release. A month later, it returned to number three on the chart and jumped to number one on the Billboard Digital Albums chart after a one-day, 25-cent promotion of its downloadable version by Google Play and Amazon.com pushed digital sales up 1,367%.

Track listing

Reception

Allmusic critic Andy Kellman summarizes the chart performance of the songs in Now That's What I Call Music! 41 by noting that three of the songs, "Sexy and I Know It", "The One That Got Away", and "Domino", were in the top ten of the Billboard Hot 100 at the time of the album's release in February 2012, and calling Lady Gaga's "Marry the Night" and Nickelback's "Lullaby" "duds in comparison". The inclusion of two country songs bring this edition a "more country flavor", at least compared to Now! 40, and "the compilation's highlights" are Coldplay's "Paradise" and J. Cole's "Work Out".

Charts

Weekly charts

Year-end charts

Decade-end charts

References

External links
 Official U.S. Now That's What I Call Music website
 

2012 compilation albums
 041
EMI Records compilation albums